Cartomancy is fortune-telling or divination using a deck of cards. Forms of cartomancy appeared soon after playing cards were first introduced into Europe in the 14th century. Practitioners of cartomancy are generally known as cartomancers, card readers, or simply readers.

Cartomancy using standard playing cards was the most popular form of providing fortune-telling card readings in the 18th, 19th, and 20th centuries. The standard 52-card deck is often augmented with jokers or even with the blank card found in many packaged decks. In France, the 32-card piquet stripped deck is most typically used in cartomantic readings, although the 52 card deck can also be used. (A piquet deck can be a 52-card deck with all of the 2s through the 6s removed. This leaves all of the 7s through the 10s, the face cards, and the aces.)

In English-speaking countries, the most common form of cartomancy is generally tarot card reading. Tarot cards are almost exclusively used for this purpose in these places.

Methods
The most popular method of cartomancy using a standard playing deck is referred to as the Wheel of Fortune. Here, the reader removes cards at random and assigns significance to them based on the order they were chosen. Though the interpretation of various cards varies by region, the common significators for the future are as follows:

See also
Marie Anne Lenormand
Johann Kaspar Hechtel
The Suhl card reader case
Patience (game)
Teuila cards

References

External links
 Origins of Cartomancy (Playing Card Divination)

 
Playing cards